NH1, or NH-1, or similar, may refer to:
 NH1 News, a New Hampshire based television and radio news network formerly aired on WBIN-TV and WNNH
 Howard NH-1, a World War II instrument training aircraft
 National Highway 1 (Cambodia)
 National Highway 1 (India)
 New Hampshire's 1st congressional district